Han Mei (born 27 January 1998) is a Chinese speed skater.

Biography 
Han was born in Hohhot, Inner Mongolia, China in 1998.

Career 
At the 2016 Youth Olympic Games in Lillehammer, Han won three silver medals. She competed at the ISU Junior Speed Skating World Cup and won the silver medal in the Women's 1000m category. She competed in the 2018 Winter Olympics in the Women's team pursuit.

References 

1998 births
Chinese female speed skaters
Speed skaters at the 2017 Asian Winter Games
Medalists at the 2017 Asian Winter Games
Asian Games medalists in speed skating
Asian Games silver medalists for China
Asian Games bronze medalists for China
People from Hohhot
Living people
Speed skaters at the 2016 Winter Youth Olympics
Olympic speed skaters of China
Speed skaters at the 2018 Winter Olympics
Speed skaters at the 2022 Winter Olympics
20th-century Chinese women
21st-century Chinese women